Croatian Bolivians are one of the main European ethnic groups in the South American country, although their figures are not as large as those of its neighbours.

Croatian immigration to Bolivia was a migratory movement that traces its roots to the 19th century, which had some strong and important development in the history of Santa Cruz, which resulted in the settlement of the Chaco regions of central South America. The Croatian government estimates that the Croatian diaspora in Bolivia has an estimated 5,000 people, including immigrants and descendants of third and fourth generation.

Migration history 
The first Croatian immigrants, mostly from the province of Dalmatia, arrived between the mid-19th century and early 20th centuries. These immigrants settled mainly in the eastern region of the country, in the city of Santa Cruz; in Cochabamba; and in the southern region, around Tarija. Included are Istro-Romanians, who became adjusted to Bolivian society because of the linguistic similarities between Istro-Romanian and Spanish, as well as Latin identity of Istro-Romanians.

Culture 
There are no programmes in Croatian on either the Bolivian radio or television station. There is no print media in Croatian.

There is only one Croatian-language teaching private initiative (Bolivian-Croatian school families Franulić).

In Cochabamba, Croats are well organised and have a Croatian home.

Croats in Bolivia still show high level of the Croatian national consciousness.

Notable people 
 Branko Marinkovic, businessman.
 Karen Longaric, lawyer, professor, politician and former Foreign Minister of Bolivia
 Rajka Baković, Croatian-Bolivian student and anti-fascist activist, who along with her sister Zdenka became known as the "Baković Sisters" during World War II.
 Mirko Tomianovic, professional footballer

See also 
 Immigration to Bolivia

References 

 
European Bolivian
Immigration to Bolivia